The Second League consisted of 12 participants.

Participants
 FC Karpaty Bolekhiv
 FC Koloc Pyadyky
 FC Pidhirya
 FC Prut Deliatyn
 FC Karpaty Kuty
 FC Krona-Karpaty Broshniv-Osada
 FC Dnister Poberezhia
 FC Meteor Zhykotyn (newly entered, plays in Korshev)
 FC Yunior Lysets (newly entered, reorganized of Enerhetyk Ivano-Frankivsk 30-years ago)
 FC Neptune Zabolotiv (newly entered, split from FC Pokuttia Sniatyn last year)
 FC Hutsulschyna Kosiv (newly entered from the Oblast Championship 2008)
 FC Yaspil Yaseniv-Pilnyi (newly entered)

Note:
 FC Karpaty Pechenizhyn and FC Cheremosh Verkhovyna did not reapply

See also
Ivano-Frankivsk Oblast Championship 2009
Ivano-Frankivsk Oblast FF

Ivano-Frankivsk Oblast Second League
5
5